The 47th Sikhs were an infantry regiment of the British Indian Army. They could trace their origins to 1901, when they were raised as the 47th (Sikh) Bengal Infantry.

After World War I, the Indian government reformed the army moving from single battalion regiments to multi battalion regiments. In 1922, the 47th Sikhs now became the 5th Battalion, 11th Sikh Regiment. The regiment was allocated to the new India on independence.

References

Sources

British Indian Army infantry regiments
Military units and formations established in 1901
Military units and formations disestablished in 1922
Bengal Presidency